Free Korea Peak, is a mountain in the Kyrgyz Ala-Too Range of the Tian Shan. It is located in Ala Archa National Park in Kyrgyzstan. It is one of the most famous peaks in the former Soviet Union, with a 900m wall on its northern face that is famously challenging to climb.

Sources differ on Free Korea Peak's elevation, with both 4740m and 4777m quoted. To its north and slightly to the west lies the Ak-Sai Glacier.

History 

The first ascent along the northern wall was made by an expedition led by V. Andreev in 1959.

Prior to the discovery in the late 1980s of the 4810m Peak 4810 in Karavshin, Free Korea Peak, together with Ushba and Chatyn-Tau in the Caucasus, were considered some of the most difficult and prestigious peaks to climb in the former Soviet Union.

References

Mountains of Kyrgyzstan
Chüy Region
Four-thousanders of the Tian Shan
Mountains of Ala Archa National Park